Planaltoa is a genus of flowering plants in the tribe Eupatorieae within the family Asteraceae.

The generic name Planaltoa refers to the Planalto Central (Brazilian Highlands) in southern, central, and eastern Brazil.

 Species
 Planaltoa lychnophoroides G.M.Barroso - Goiás
 Planaltoa salviifolia Taub.  - Goiás

References

Eupatorieae
Asteraceae genera
Endemic flora of Brazil